Moneni Pirates FC is a Eswatinii soccer club based in Manzini. They play in the top division in Swazi football. The team plays in white and black colors.

History
The club was established by Ngungunyane Matsenjwa, with an aim of bringing together youths of Moneni township in the outskirts of Manzini.

The late Matsenjwa left behind his widow Catherine Sibanyoni - Matsenjwa, His Children, Nomusa Matsenjwa, Vuyisile Matsenjwa ( Now late), Futhi Matsenjwa, Dudu Matsenjwa, Nkanyezi Matsenjwa - Nzima, Thulisile Matsenjwa, Gelane Matsenjwa, and Zweli Matsenjwa.

He also left behind his grandchildren Sindile Magagula - Gumede, Majaha Mkhatjwa and Siphilele Nzima.

Prior to the club being taken over by Matsenjwa, it was known as The Blue Birds Football Club. In 1967, the club's name changed to Moneni Pirates FC, inspired by Soweto giants, Orlando Pirates. A lot of clubs in Eswatini are named after popular clubs in South Africa. This is because Swazi football fans follow clubs in South Africa, and the local clubs look to export talent to the more professional Premier Soccer League.

The club has been relegated from the highest league in then-Swaziland three times in its history – in the 1998–1999, the 2005–06 seasons and the 2014–15 season. It quickly regained promotion in the elite league on all three occasions of relegation, with the latest happening through a 2nd position finish in the National First Division in the 2016/16 season. It finished the first round of the 2016/17 season in a mid-table position of the Premier League, after it finished the round strongly following a slow start in the league.

In the current season, 2019/20 season, the club has been a revelation, resulting in football pundits comparing it to its yesteryears. At the time of COVID-19 lockdown, the Club was placed in position 4 of the MTN League, with a fighting shot to finish 2nd. Time will tell on whether the League will result and finish.

Current squad

Stadium
Currently the team plays at the 8,000 capacity Mavuso Stadium in Manzini.

Performance in Caf competitions
1989 African Cup Winners' Cup: first round

Honors
 Swazi Bank Cup: 2015
 Swazi Telecom Charity Cup: 2009
 Trade Fair Cup: 2001
 Inyatsi Top-8: 1995
 BP Cup: 1992
 Interboard (Trade Fair) Cup: 1992
 BP Cup: 1989

Managers
 Gcina Dlamini (2019/20)
 Zenzele Dlamini (2016/17)
 Mlamuli Zwane (2015/16 & 2016/17)
 Happy Simfukwe (2014/15)
 Golding Dube (2014/15)
 Van Rooyen Magagula (2013/14)
 Zenzele Dlamini (2005/06, 2012/13 – last 5 games; 2013/14 – first round & 2014–15 – Assistant Coach from January 2015)
 Harries Bulunga (2012/13)
 Dumisa Mahlalela (2003, 2006/07 & 2011/12)
 Mlamuli Zwane (2008/09 – 2010/11)
 Sipho Sibandze (2002/03 – 2003/04)
 Christopher Khoza (1999/2000 & 2001/2002)
 David "Botsotso" Manyatsi (2000/01)
 Jan Simulambo (1998/99)
 Mandla Dlamini (1997/98)
 Nino Mahel (1996/97)

Chairmen
 Osborne Nzima (2018 – Present) 
 December Mavimbela (2014 – 2017)
 Thulani Hlanze (2010 - 2014)
 Sipho Matse (2008 - 2010)
 Zakhele Dlamini (2006 - 2008)
 Bhekisisa Zwane (2000 - 2006)
 George Motsa (1997 - 2000)
 John Maziya (1991 - 1997)
 Desmond Oswin (1986 - 1991)
 Mathokoza Mtsetfwa (1985 - 1986)
 Ngununyane Matsenjwa (1967 - 1985)

References

External links
Soccerway
Weltfussball (archive.org)

Football clubs in Eswatini